Daniel Rasilla Colaso (born 28 April 1980) is a Spanish professional boxer. He held the Spanish lightweight and light-welterweight titles between 2007 and 2013, and has challenged once for the European light-welterweight title in 2009.

Professional career
Rasilla made his professional debut on 4 February 2006, winning a four-round unanimous decision (UD) against Marques Gil, who also debuted. On 15 December 2007, he defeated Hoang Sang Nguyen via UD to win the Spanish lightweight title. Once defence was made, against Karim El Ouazghari on 26 April 2008. In a rematch with Nguyen on 29 November 2008, Rasilla lost the title after being stopped in two rounds. On 21 March 2009, fighting out of his native Spain for the first time, he travelled to Ireland and lost a UD against Andrew Murray, with the vacant European Union lightweight title at stake.

In another trip away from home on 6 November 2009, this time to Northern Ireland to fight for the vacant European light-welterweight title, Rasilla was stopped in nine rounds by Paul McCloskey. On 15 May 2010, Rasilla won the vacant Spanish light-welterweight title by knocking out Juan Zapata in five rounds. A third attempt to win a major regional championship—the European Union light-welterweight title—ended in a split draw against defending champion Ville Piispanen on 27 November 2010.

Professional boxing record

References

External links

Spanish male boxers
Lightweight boxers
Light-welterweight boxers
Welterweight boxers
1980 births
Boxers from Cantabria
Sportspeople from Santander, Spain
Living people